The 2018–19 En Avant de Guingamp season was the 106th professional season of the club since its creation in 1912.

Players

Out on loan

Competitions

Ligue 1

League table

Results summary

Results by round

Matches

Coupe de France

Coupe de la Ligue

References

En Avant Guingamp seasons
En Avant de Guingamp